Nyctemera radiata is a moth of the family Erebidae first described by Francis Walker in 1856. It is found in the Philippines.

References

 

Nyctemerina
Moths described in 1856